Theodolphus Alexander Cox (1855–1908) was a New Zealand cricketer who played four first-class matches for Wellington in the 1880s.

External links
CricketArchive Profile

1855 births
1908 deaths
New Zealand cricketers
Wellington cricketers